The Dafali (called with different names like Sheikh Masoodi) Masoodi or Mujawar and Dafali are a Muslim community found all over India with the majority being in the state of Uttar Pradesh surname Masoodi. The Government of India reservations programme for poor category they have been categorized in Other Backward Class (OBC) category in Uttar Pradesh. Dafali / Masoodi can be also found in India, Pakistan, Bangladesh, and Nepal.

Origin

The community have acquired their name from the Hindi and Urdu word , meaning tambourine, which they used to play during wars and marriages in earlier times.
They are one of the very few Muslim communities which have been Muslim since the origin, i.e. they are not converts. They played the daf instrument at various Sufi shrines in North India. The community traces its descent to the Sufi saint of Bahraich Syed Salar Masood Ghazi popularly known as Ghazi Mian.

The Dafali are found throughout the country, primarily in Uttar Pradesh, with special concentrations in Pilibhit, Rampur, Moradabad, Sambhal, Badauon, Saharanpur, Kanpur and Bareilly districts in the west, where the community speak Khari boli, while in Awadh, they are found mainly in the districts of Lucknow, Bahraich, Balrampur, Gonda, Shravasti and Sitapur, Basti District, Balrampur, Gonda, Shravasti and Sitapur, Sidharth Nagar District/Sidharthnagar, Allahabad, Pratapgarh, Jaunpur where the community speak Awadhi and their tribal language 'Madaah'.

Current circumstances

There traditional occupation was playing the daf during wars as well as at various Sufi shrines. Like other Muslim artisan groups, they have seen a decline in their traditional occupation.
Many are now engaged in the different occupations including business and farming activities and a good population of the people are engaged in government sector as well in services like PCS and Judiciary.

The community live religious settlements, but occupy their own distinct quarters. Each settlement has a which acts as an instrument of social control, and is headed by "Chaudhary" Who is elected by the community elders, for a term with intra community disputes, as well as punishing those who breach communal norms.

References

People from Uttar Pradesh
Muslim communities in Asia